Loukela  is a district in the Cuvette Region of the Republic of the Congo. The capital lies at Loukela.

Towns and villages

Cuvette Department
Districts of the Republic of the Congo